Izzi Telecom is a Mexican telecommunications company owned by Grupo Televisa and operated by Empresas Cablevisión, S.A.B. de C.V. It is listed on the Mexican Stock Exchange under the code CABLE. izzi provides telephone, Internet, cable TV and mobile services to individuals and companies with coverage in cities in Mexico.

History 
Cablevisión was founded on October 3, 1960, by a group of 10 people led by architect Benjamín Burillo Pérez. In 1969, the Communications and Transportation Secretary granted the company, then with 300 subscribers, temporary permission to install  of coaxial cable in Colonia Roma. That same year, Cablevisión became a part of Grupo Televisa, which was owned by businessman Emilio Azcárraga Milmo.

In 2006, 49% of Cablemás and 50% of TVI ( Cablevisión Noreste) were acquired. In 2007, Bestel Company was acquired. On October 31, 2014, the company stopped operating under Cablevisión, rebranding as izzi and launching with Internet, television, and telephone service as a single product.

To strengthen the company, five cable companies were acquired in Mexico:
Cablemás (100%) in 2011
Cablecom (48%) in 2012
Cablecom (remaining 52%) in 2013
Cablevisión Red a.k.a. Telecable (100%) in 2015.

izzi was listed as the 22nd most valuable brand in Mexico in 2016.

It also operates under the name of "wizzplus" ​in some cities such as Guerrero, Zacatecas, Monclova, Manzanillo and more. 2021 arrives in Guadalajara.

Network and services 
Its offers Internet, television and telephone services for residences and businesses.  20,000-title on-demand television content is available in some areas, and on mobile devices using the izzi go app.

Internet 
10 to 1000 megabits per second of speed.

Coverage 
izzi service is available in these Mexican states and cities:

 Aguascalientes
Aguascalientes City
State of Mexico
Mexico City
Baja California
Ensenada
Mexicali
Tijuana
Tecate
Campeche
San Francisco de Campeche
Chihuahua
Camargo
Ciudad Cuauhtémoc
Ciudad Juárez
Chihuahua
Delicias
Hidalgo del Parral
Meoqui
Coahuila
Saltillo
Guerrero
Acapulco
Chilpancingo
Morelos
Cuautla de Morelos
Cuernavaca
Yautepec de Zaragoza
Oaxaca
Oaxaca City
Nuevo León
Monterrey
Quintana Roo
Cancún
Playa del Carmen
Tamaulipas
Ciudad Victoria
Reynosa
Nuevo Laredo
Matamoros
Veracruz
Poza Rica de Hidalgo
Tihuatlán
Yucatán
Mérida
Progreso
Umán
Valladolid
Tizimín
Motul
Izamal
Temax
Chemax
Zacatecas 
Jalisco
Zapopan
Puerto Vallarta
Guadalajara
Tlaquepaque
Veracruz
Coatzacoalcos
Minatitlán
Cosoleacaque
Jáltipan
Nanchital
Córdoba
Orizaba
Fortín de las Flores
Guanajuato
Irapuato

References

Mass media companies established in 1960
1960 establishments in Mexico
Cable television companies of Mexico
Mass media in Mexico City
Televisa subsidiaries